Baeturia, Beturia, or Turdetania was a region in the southern part of the Iberian Peninsula (in modern Spain) between the Guadiana and the Guadalquivir rivers. In the Iron Age, it was inhabited by Celts and the Turdetani. The territory was conquered by the Roman Republic in the 2nd century BCE.

See also

 Turdetani
 Hispania Baetica

Regions of Spain
Geography of Spain
History of Andalusia
History of Extremadura